Whitireia Park is a headland north of Titahi Bay and Te Awarua-o-Porirua Harbour in Porirua, in the Wellington Region at the southern end of New Zealand's North Island. It is a regional park administered by Wellington Regional Council.

The park includes Onehunga Bay, Kaitawa Point and part of Rocky Bay.

Geography

The headland has uplifted from the harbour during a series of earthquakes over the past one or two million years. The most recent earthquake in January 1855 created the marshland at Te Onepoto Bay and the western coastline beaches, and made Porirua Harbour too shallow for large sailing ships.

Te Onepoto Bay now provides a habitat for water birds, including kingfishers and white-faced herons. There are also some little shags, black shags, royal spoonbills, black backed gulls and shore plover.

The wetland behind the Onehunga Bay carpark is dominated by toetoe and flax, where pūkeko, paradise ducks and other wetland birds live. The dunes at the bay are also being planted with spinifex, pingao, shore spurge, sand tussock, sand daphne and native iris, where native insects and lizards live.

History

Pre-European history

Polynesian explorer Kupe is believed to have landed just south of Titahi Bay at Komangarautawhiri. According to oral history, his canoe floated away on the outgoing tide and then returned to shore on an incoming tide.

The anchor stone of Kupe's canoe is believed to have remained in Onehunga Bay for centuries and was respected by Māori tribes. During the 1840s, British troops drowned after breaking chips off the stone, and some Māori believed it was punishment for sacrilege. The stone is now stored at Museum of New Zealand Te Papa Tongarewa, but there is a monument at the Onehunga Bay carpark.

Before European settlement, Māori fished the waters for kina, pāua and kuku.

Ngāti Toa conquered the area in the mid-1820s under the leadership of Te Rauparaha, partly due to its strategic position near early European trading ports. The headland had sparse vegetation, and the population lived on a diet of seafood, bracken ferns and kumara, and their kumara-growing terraces are still visible above the headland cliffs.

An archaeological survey by the Department of Conservation suggests Māori occupation continued until 1840s.

Trust reserve

The park was established by a local trust board and the Broadcasting Corporation of New Zealand in 1976, with support from Ngāti Toa and local businesses. Under a management plan finalised in 1978, the Department of Conservation was also involved in managing the park.

In the decades since, a track has been built around the park, and the New Zealand Defence Force has removed abandoned motor vehicle bodies from around the headland.

In 2006, work began on replanting the wetland behind the Onehunga Bay carpark.

Much of the vegetation on the headland was destroyed in a fire in February 2010. Working bees have been organised to replant the park.

Regional park

Wellington Regional Council took control of the park in March 2011, with Ngāti Toa continuing to be involved in its management.

Dog leashes became mandatory at Onehunga Bay in February 2017.

In 2018, Radio New Zealand proposed having some of its greenfield land rezoned for residential development.

Part of the park walking track was closed in July 2021 due to a sewage leak.

Recreation

The park has views over Mana Island and the South Island to the west, Te Awarua-o-Porirua Harbour to the east and south.

The Onepoto loop track runs up the hill from Onehunga Bay, down through the inland valley and back through to the bay. It takes almost two hours to complete, and requires moderate fitness and decent footwear. Parts of the track are exposed to sea winds.

The park is also used for fishing, mountain biking, horse riding, rock climbing, bird spotting, orienteering, model plane flying, canoeing, kitesurfing, diving, picnicking and swimming.

The park is open 6am-6pm from May to August, 6am-7pm during September, 6am-8pm during October, 6am-9pm from November to February, 6am-8pm during March, and 6am-7pm during April. The park may be closed at any time due to weather conditions.

Dogs are permitted but must be kept under control, and must be kept on a leash at Onehunga Bay. Fire and fireworks are banned at all times.

References

Porirua
Regional parks of New Zealand
Parks in the Wellington Region
Landforms of the Wellington Region
Radio New Zealand